Pilip is a masculine given name, cognate to Philip.

It may refer to:

 Pilip Ballach Ó Duibhgeannáin (fl. 1579–1590), Irish hereditary historian
 Pilip Vaitsiakhovich (born 1990), Belarusian football player

Pilip is also a surname of:

 Ivan Pilip (born 1963), Czech politician and economist
 Mazi Melesa Pilip, Ethiopian-born American politician

See also
 Filip
 Pylyp

Irish masculine given names
Belarusian masculine given names